Castle Hill Hospital is an NHS hospital to the west of Cottingham, East Riding of Yorkshire, England, and is run by Hull University Teaching Hospitals NHS Trust.

History

Hull Sanatorium, designed by Joseph Hirst, was built on the site of Cottingham Castle, a large castellated mansion which had burnt down in 1861, between 1913 and 1916. In 1928 the City Hospital for infectious diseases moved from its original location on Hedon Road to newly erected buildings on the Hull Sanatorium site.

A major expansion of the hospital was procured under a Private Finance Initiative contract in 2005. The Queen's Centre for Oncology and Haematology, which was designed by HLM Architects and built by Shepherd Building Group at a cost of £65 million, was completed in August 2008 and was officially opened by the Queen and the Duke of Edinburgh in March 2009.

In 2022 an 11,000-panel solar farm was installed on site to supply the hospital with enough electricity to cover all of its daytime needs.

Facilities
Castle Hill Hospital is home to the Daisy Building, the headquarters of the Daisy Charity. The charity supports research into cancer, dementia, cardiological and haematological illnesses and respiratory medicine.

See also
 List of hospitals in England

References

External links

Hull University Teaching Hospitals NHS Trust website

Hospitals in the East Riding of Yorkshire
NHS hospitals in England
Cottingham, East Riding of Yorkshire